The 2023 Voronezh Oblast gubernatorial election will take place on 10 September 2023, on common election day. Incumbent Governor Aleksandr Gusev is running to a second term in office.

Background
Voronezh Mayor Aleksandr Gusev was appointed acting Governor of Voronezh Oblast in December 2017, replacing second-term incumbent Alexey Gordeyev, who was elevated to the position of Presidential Envoy to the Central Federal District. Gusev won gubernatorial election in September 2018 with 72.52% of the vote.

Candidates
In Voronezh Oblast candidates for Governor can be nominated only by registered political parties, self-nomination is not possible. However, candidates are not obliged to be members of the nominating party. Candidate for Governor of Voronezh Oblast should be a Russian citizen and at least 30 years old. Candidates for Governor should not have a foreign citizenship or residence permit. Each candidate in order to be registered is required to collect at least 5% of signatures of members and heads of municipalities. Also gubernatorial candidates present 3 candidacies to the Federation Council and election winner later appoints one of the presented candidates.

Declared
 Aleksandr Gusev (United Russia), incumbent Governor of Nizhny Novgorod Oblast (2017–present)

Publicly expressed interest
 Andrey Rogatnev (CPRF), Member of Voronezh Oblast Duma (2005–2010, 2015–present)

Potential
 Maksim Gusev (Rodina), Member of Povorinsky District Council of People's Deputies (2022–present)
 Dmitry Kuznetsov (SR–ZP), Member of State Duma (2021–present)

See also
2023 Russian regional elections

References

Voronezh Oblast
Voronezh Oblast
Politics of Voronezh Oblast